Jehanne, or Joan of Arc, is a patron saint of France.

Jehanne or variant, may also refer to:

 Jehanne la Pucelle d'Ay de Domremy (1412–1431, Saint Joan of Arc), Patron Saint of France
 Jehanne d'Alcy (1865–1956), French actress
 Jehanne Collard (1950–2021), French lawyer
 Jehanne d'Orliac (1883–1974), French dramatist
 Jehanne Mance (1606–1673), co-founder of Montreal
 Jehanne Rousseau (born 1976), French videogame producer
 Jehanne Wake (born 1966), British biographer
 Édith Jéhanne (1899–1949), French actress
 Jeanne (given name), spelled "Jehanne" in medieval Middle French but "Jeanne" in modern French
 Joan (given name), spelled "Jehanne" in medieval Anglo-Norman but "Joan" in modern English

See also

 Jehan
 
 Jeanne (disambiguation)
 Jean (disambiguation)

 Joan (disambiguation)
 Joanne (disambiguation)

French feminine given names